Mohammed Sanni Abdulkadir   (born 16 February 1953) is an academician and is the 4th Vice Chancellor of Kogi State University. Mohammed was appointed by the Governor of Kogi State, Capt. Idris Ichalla Wada to take over from Prof. Hassan S. Isah.

Early life and education
Mohammed was born at Dekina, a local government in Kogi State, Nigeria. He started his primary education at Native Authority primary school (1958-1966) where he later proceeded to Arabic central school at Idah (1967-1969). He attended College of Arts and Islamic Studies, Sokoto (1970-1975) before gaining admission to school of preliminary studies Abdullahi Bayero College (1976-1977).
Mohammed got his Bachelor's, Masters and Doctorate degree in History (1977-1990).

Career
He began his career as a Graduate Assistant (1981) at Bayero University and rose to the post of a Professor of Economic History (October 2000).
He served as Head of Department of History, Deputy Dean of Postgraduate school at Bayero University, Kano.

Publications
Mohammed has various publications of which include A political and economic history of Igala land, Central Nigeria (1896-1939).

Affiliations
He is a member of various professional bodies which include; Member, National Universities Commission and also the Historical Society of Nigeria.

Awards
He got the People Conference for Peace Award in 2008.

Personal life
He is married with children.

References

1953 births
Living people
Bayero University Kano alumni
Academic staff of Kogi State University
Vice-Chancellors of Nigerian universities
Nigerian historians